Seychelles Time, or SCT, is a time zone used by the nation of Seychelles in the Somali Sea. The zone is four hours ahead of UTC (UTC+04:00).

Daylight saving time is not observed in this time zone.

Time zones